Formula Renault Eurocup was a Formula Renault motor racing championship. Eurocup raced only on European circuits.

It served as a support series to the Formula Renault 3.5 Series as part of the World Series by Renault from 2005 to 2015. Renault Sport offered a prize of €500,000  to the winner of the Eurocup until 2015. Following the 2020 season, the Formula Renault Eurocup merged with the Formula Regional European Championship due to COVID-19 pandemic.

History
The series was established in 1991, as the "Rencontres Internationales de Formule Renault", before switching to the "Eurocup Formula Renault" name in 1993.

In 2000, renamed to Formula Renault 2000 Eurocup and Eurocup Formula Renault 2.0 since 2005 used up to now, excludes the 2003 season named Formula Renault 2000 Masters.

While a support series of the Formula Renault 3.5 many drivers  stepped up to the senior category, for example the 2006 champion Filipe Albuquerque, fourth-place finisher Bertrand Baguette and 13th-place finisher Xavier Maassen being the first to do so that on the full-time basis for the 2007 season. 2007 champion Brendon Hartley did not follow suit however, and instead moved firstly to British Formula Three Championship. Meanwhile, Charles Pic and Alexandre Marsoin joined FR 3.5 for the 2008. 2008 champion Valtteri Bottas moved to the Formula 3 Euro Series, and only Anton Nebylitskiy who was placed 20th, made his debut in FR 3.5 in 2009. 2009 was the first season when the champion received money to graduate to FR 3.5 and Albert Costa used this opportunity. He was joined in the 2010 Formula Renault 3.5 Series season by sixth-place finisher Nathanaël Berthon. Like Costa, 2010 champion Kevin Korjus and his rivals Arthur Pic, Daniël de Jong and André Negrão moved to FR 3.5 in 2011. 2011 champion Robin Frijns not only graduated to FR 3.5 in 2012, he also became the first driver, who won both Eurocup and FR 3.5 Series consecutively. Other 2011 Eurocup graduates, who moved to FR 3.5 were Will Stevens and Vittorio Ghirelli. 2012 champion Stoffel Vandoorne and his contender Norman Nato headed to FR 3.5 in 2013. Pierre Gasly and Oliver Rowland, who fought till the last race for the 2013 Eurocup title, both graduated to FR 3.5 in 2014. They was joined by Luca Ghiotto, Matthieu Vaxivière and Roman Mavlanov. Nyck de Vries dominated the 2014 championship and moved to FR 3.5 in 2015. Egor Orudzhev, Aurélien Panis and Gustav Malja moved to Formula Renault 3.5 as well.

Car specifications

The chassis was built at Alpine's Dieppe plant, a Renault subsidiary. The aerodynamic kit was designed by Tatuus. All Eurocup Formula Renault 2.0 cars use the same specifications.
 Chassis: FR2.0/13. Carbon-fibre bodywork
 Engine: Renault F4R 832 – 4-cylinder – 16 valve – 1998cc. 210 bhp at 7,500rpm. 220Nm at 5,500rpm
 Transmission: SADEV seven-speed sequential + reverse gear. XAP electric control gearshift, semi-automatic steering-wheel mounted
 Front suspension: ZF Race Engineering single damper, two-way adjustable
 Rear suspension: ZF Race Engineering double damper, two-way adjustable
 Brakes: Four-piston calipers with 278 x 18 mm steel discs
 Rims: Aluminium one-piece 9 x 13 (front) and 10 x 13 (rear)
 Tyres: Michelin 20-54 x 13 (front) and 24-57 x 13 (rear)
 Length/width/height: 4270 / 1740 / 950mm
 Front and rear track: 1502 / 1440mm
 Fuel tank: 50 litres
 Unloaded weight: 506 kg

Champions

Prior Formula Renault Eurocup

Formula Renault Eurocup

Notes

References

External links

 

Formula Renault 2.0 series
Formula Renault 2.0
Renault Sport Series